Kriška Vas (in older sources also Križna Vas) is a village south of Višnja Gora in the Municipality of Ivančna Gorica in central Slovenia. The area is part of the historical region of Lower Carniola. The municipality is now included in the Central Slovenia Statistical Region.

Church

The local church is dedicated to Mary Magdalene and belongs to the Parish of Višnja Gora. It was built in the 16th century and was partially rebuilt in the 17th century.

References

External links

Kriška Vas on Geopedia

Populated places in the Municipality of Ivančna Gorica